The Sentinel is a 1992 French thriller film, directed by Arnaud Desplechin. It was entered into the 1992 Cannes Film Festival.

Cast
 Emmanuel Salinger - Mathias Barillet
 Thibault de Montalembert - Jean-Jacques
 Jean-Louis Richard - Bleicher
 Valérie Dréville - Nathalie
 Marianne Denicourt - Marie Barillet
 Jean-Luc Boutté - Varins
 Bruno Todeschini - William
 Philippe Duclos - Macaigne
 Fabrice Desplechin - Simon
 Emmanuelle Devos - Claude
 Philippe Laudenbach - The priest
 László Szabó - Pamiat, the Russian (as Laszlo Szabo)
 Alexis Nitzer - Consul
 Mathieu Amalric - A medical student
 Nadine Alari - Mme. Barillet
 Jean-Pierre Ducos - Customs officer
 Hubert Gillet - Cop on train
 Louis-Do de Lencquesaing

Accolades

References

External links
 

1992 films
1990s French-language films
1990s spy thriller films
Films directed by Arnaud Desplechin
Films with screenplays by Arnaud Desplechin
French spy thriller films
1992 directorial debut films
1990s French films